Krøyer's deep sea angler fish (Ceratias holboelli) is a species of fish in the family Ceratiidae, the sea devils. The much smaller males only reach  and they are symbiotic, as they attach themselves to a female.

The species' scientific epithet commemorates Carl Peter Holbøll, a Danish civil servant and early explorer of the fauna of Greenland. Several specimens have been found in the stomachs of sperm whales caught in the Azores and in the Antarctic.

Other common names include longray seadevil and northern seadevil.

References

Further reading
 Tony Ayling & Geoffrey Cox, Collins Guide to the Sea Fishes of New Zealand,  (William Collins Publishers Ltd, Auckland, New Zealand 1982) 

Ceratiidae
Deep sea fish
Bioluminescent fish